Sultan Dumalondong, officially the Municipality of Sultan Dumalondong (Maranao: Inged a Sultan Dumalondong), is a 6th class municipality in the province of Lanao del Sur, Philippines. According to the 2020 census, it has a population of 12,500 people.

It was created under Muslim Mindanao Autonomy Act No. 36 in 1995. It took 3 barangays and 6 sitios from Butig, 1 barangay and 9 sitios in Lumbatan, 9 barangays and 8 sitios in Lumbayanague.

Geography

Barangays
Sultan Dumalondong is politically subdivided into 7 barangays.
Bacayawan
Dinganun Guilopa (Dingunun)
Lumbac
Malalis
Pagalongan
Tagoranao
Sumalindao

Climate

Demographics

Economy

References

External links
Sultan Dumalondong Profile at the DTI Cities and Municipalities Competitive Index
[ Philippine Standard Geographic Code]
Philippine Census Information
Local Governance Performance Management System

Municipalities of Lanao del Sur